John Michael Erlewine (born July 18, 1941) is an American musician, astrologer, photographer, TV host, publisher and Internet entrepreneur who founded the music online database site AllMusic (previously known as All Music Guide) in 1991.

Career
Erlewine has had several careers. As a musician, he was active in the Michigan folk scene in the late 1950s and early 1960s. In 1961 he hitchhiked with Bob Dylan, and had traveled to Greenwich Village, Venice, California, and San Francisco. He and his brother Dan founded a blues band called The Prime Movers, which regularly played Chicago; other members included "Blue" Gene Tyranny (Robert Sheff). When the drummer left, they replaced him with Iggy Pop (James Osterberg), then 18 years old. The Prime Movers gave him the nickname "Iggy" as he had played in the band The Iguanas. According to biographer Jim Ambrose, the two years Osterberg spent in the band made him aware of "art, politics, and experimentation".

In 1977 Erlewine founded Matrix Software. He was the first person to program astrology on microcomputers and make astrological programs available to the astrological community. He has published more than forty books on astrology and related topics.
Michael Erlewine and his band, the Prime Movers, were inducted into the Michigan Rock and Roll Legends Hall of Fame in 2015.

Family
Erlewine and his wife have four children. He is the uncle of American music critic Stephen Thomas Erlewine.

All Music Guide
In the 1990s, Erlewine founded the All Music Guide (allmusic.com), the All Movie Guide (allmovie.com), and the All Game Guide (allgame.com). The first site in particular has become an important popular music reference that licenses its content to numerous other websites. Erlewine regained control of Matrix Software (astrologysoftware.com) in November 2008 and continues as director of that company.

Television channel
Erlewine is the host on a 12-segment television channel called Spirit Grooves/Dharma Grooves, featuring topics on alternative awareness and reaching some 540,000 viewers.

Publications
 Erlewine, Michael, 1980, "Astrological programming manual", American Federation of Astrologers, Tempe, Ariz.
 Erlewine, Michael, 1992, "All-Music Guide", editor (Miller-Freeman)
 Erlewine, Michael, 1999, "All-Music Guide to the Blues", editor (Miller-Freeman)
 Erlewine, Michael, 1999, "All-Music Guide to Rock", editor (Miller-Freeman)
 Erlewine, Michael, 1997, "All-Music Guide to Country", editor (Miller-Freeman)
 Erlewine, Michael, 1996, "All-Music Guide to Jazz", editor (Miller-Freeman)
 Erlewine, Michael, 1976, "The Sun Is Shining", paperback (Heart Center Publications)
 Erlewine, Michael, 1976, "Astrophysical Directions", paperback (Heart Center Publications)
 Erlewine, Michael, 1976, "Interface: Planetary Nodes”, paperback (Heart Center Publications)
 Erlewine, Michael, 1981, “Local Space: Relocation Astrology”, paperback (Heart Center Publications)
 Erlewine, Michael, “Tibetan Earth Lords: Tibetan Astrology and Geomancy”, paperback (Heart Center Publications)
 Erlewine, Michael, 2007, “Astrology's Mirror: Full-Phase Aspects”, paperback (Heart Center Publications)
 Erlewine, Michael, 1998, “Our Pilgrimage to Tibet”, paperback (Heart Center Publications)
 Erlewine, Michael, 1980, “Burn Rate: Retrogrades in Astrology”, paperback (Heart Center Publications)
 Erlewine, Michael, 2005, “Mother Moon: Astrology of 'The Lights'”, paperback (Heart Center Publications)
 Erlewine, Michael, 2007, “Interpret Astrology: The 360 3-Way Combinations”, paperback (Heart Center Publications)
 Erlewine, Michael, 2007, “Interpret Astrology: The House Combinations”, paperback (Heart Center Publications)
 Erlewine, Michael, 2007, “Interpret Astrology: The Planetary Combinations”, paperback (Heart Center Publications)
 Erlewine, Michael, 2008, “Astrology of the Heart: Astro-Shamanism”, paperback (Heart Center Publications)
 Erlewine, Michael, 2008, “The Astrology of Space”, paperback (Heart Center Publications)
 Erlewine, Michael, 2008, “StarTypes: Life-Path Partners”, paperback (Heart Center Publications)
 Erlewine, Michael, 2008, “How to Learn Astrology”, paperback (Heart Center Publications)
 Erlewine, Michael, 2008, “The Art of Feng Shui”, paperback (Heart Center Publications)
 Erlewine, Michael, 2008, “Tibetan Astrology”, paperback (Heart Center Publications)
 Erlewine, Michael, 2010, “Experiences with Mahamudra”, paperback (Heart Center Publications)
 Erlewine, Michael, 2010, “Nature in the Backyard”, paperback (Heart Center Publications)
 Erlewine, Michael, 2010, “Dharma Poems”, paperback (Heart Center Publications)
 Erlewine, Michael and Stanley Livingston, 2010, “Blues in Black & White: The Landmark Ann Arbor Blues Festivals”, paperback (University of Michigan Press)

References

External links

Matrix Software

Interview, I-94 Bar
Rockcriticsarchives.com interview
Startypes.com interview
[ AllMusic Guide Biography of The Prime Movers] by Terry Jenkins
The Prime Movers Rusted Chrome profile

1941 births
Living people
20th-century American businesspeople
20th-century astrologers
21st-century American businesspeople
21st-century astrologers
American astrologers
American computer businesspeople
American photographers
American television hosts
Businesspeople from Pennsylvania
People from Big Rapids, Michigan
Musicians from Lancaster, Pennsylvania
Protopunk musicians